Keshet International is the global production and distribution arm of Israeli media company Keshet Media Group. Keshet International was established in 2012 and is led by chief executive officer Alon Shtruzman. The company has subsidiaries in the United States, United Kingdom, and Germany that develop and produce Keshet properties with local talent, and a distribution hub in Asia.

In addition to distributing Keshet Media Group properties, Keshet International sells third party properties and develops and produces localized versions of popular television formats.  Programs distributed by Keshet International include Prisoners of War, the Israeli show that Emmy Award-winning show from which Homeland was adapted; Master Class; The A Word, which was sold to BBC One; Rising Star; False Flag; The Gordin Cell, which was adapted in the United States as M.I.C.E. (later Coercion) and launched in January 2014.

Keshet International is represented by William Morris Endeavor in the United States.

History
Keshet International was established in 2012 and is led by chief executive officer and television executive Alon Shtruzman. Shtruzman previously served as executive producer and creative director for Israel's Cable Programming (ICP). He also co-founded Noga Communications Ltd., Israel's first independent channel producer, in 1995. Shtruzman later founded the Israel's first interactive TV studio, Zoe Interactive.

Keshet International began expanding internationally when it opened London-based Keshet UK in 2012, which co-produces The A Word with Fifty Fathoms for BBC One. In 2013, Keshet International teamed up with Beverly Hills-based Dick Clark Productions to set up a joint venture Keshet-DCP to license Keshet's unscripted properties and formats for the North American market. In 2015, Keshet International launched Keshet Studios, a Los Angeles-based studio overseeing Keshet's U.S. activities including production, development, promotion, packaging, and sales of KI's IP and original scripted programming. In 2017, Keshet International acquired Munich-based production company, Tresor TV Produktions GmbH. In March 2018, the global producer and distributor acquired a majority stake in UK production company incubator, investor and business accelerator Greenbird Media and later that same year, Keshet International launched a scripted arm with Tresor in Germany called Keshet Tresor Fiction.

Properties
As a distributor, Keshet International is best known for its scripted formats such as The A Word, which is based on Keren Margalit's Yellow Peppers for Keshet 12 and has been adapted in the UK, the Netherlands and Greece to date; False Flag which Keshet UK remade for Apple TV as Suspicion with Uma Thurman; The Gordin Cell which was adapted in the United States as M.I.C.E. (later Coercion); and Prisoners of War, the Israeli show from which Emmy Award-winning show Homeland was adapted; the International Emmy Award-winning comedy Traffic Light and the Canneseries winning drama When Heroes Fly, which Keshet International sold to Netflix and Keshet Studios' is remaking for Apple TV as 'Echo 3'.  The group's reality and entertainment properties include Help! I Can’t Cook, Girlfri3nds. and Rising Star, the first show on television to incorporate real-time voting via a fully integrated app, which after being picked up in more than 25 territories, became the fastest-selling talent format at the time. Other talent properties commissioned by Keshet 12 in Israel and distributed by Keshet International are Master Class, a talent show for children ages 8–14. who are assigned teachers that help them prepare for performances; and Masters of Dance, which takes the booming dance show trend to a brand new level, as four dance masters each form a new company of dancers to compete in a series of head-to-head battles. Keshet International also distributes ever-popular gameshows including BOOM! and Deal with It! which have now been sold into 20 and 22 territories respectively.

Keshet International's catalogue also includes a growing slate of English language factual and finished tape, bolstered by its 2018 acquisition of a majority stake in Greenbird Media and launch of its KI Content Fund, which brought high-quality dramas like BBC One's The Trial of Christine Keeler, ABC TV's Total Control and Seven Network's Secret Bridesmaids' Business to global audiences.

Keshet Studios
With offices in Los Angeles and New York, is Keshet International's US-based production arm. Led by President Peter Traugott, it draws on KI's catalogue, as well as its network of connections, to develop, produce and package content for the US and international marketplaces. Most recent orders include A Small Light (Disney+), The Calling (NBC), Echo 3 (Apple TV+), La Brea (NBC), the critically acclaimed Our Boys (HBO), the mid-season pick-ups Lincoln Rhyme: Hunt for the Bone Collector (NBC) and The Baker and The Beauty (ABC), four seasons of YA drama Dead Girls Detective Agency (Snap) and the studio's first two feature films, The Sound of Silence and Save Yourselves! - both selected for the Sundance Film Festival's US dramatic competition in 2019 and 2020 respectively.  Other productions include The Brave (NBC), Wisdom of the Crowd (CBS); as well as the pilots Skinny Dip (CW), Suspicion (NBC), and Salamander (ABC).  Keshet Studios has a first-look deal and co-production pact for scripted fare with Universal Television which was recently extended.

Keshet UK
Keshet International's UK production arm, Keshet UK, is a British independent production company that develops and produces scripted drama and comedy for the UK and global TV markets. Established in 2012, recent commissions include Suspicion (Apple TV) starring Uma Thurman and Kunal Nayyar, local versions of Keshet formats, including The A Word (BBC One) and Ralph & Katie (BBC One), alongside Loaded (Channel 4).

Tresor TV
Since its foundation in 1992, Tresor TV has been producing high-quality programmes for the German-speaking television market with a focus on reality and factual entertainment shows. With its flair for tapping into the national and global zeitgeist, Tresor TV succeeds time and time again in shaping the German television landscape.  In 2017, Tresor TV became part of Keshet International. Recent orders include Keshet 12's Masters of Dance for ProSieben and No Body is Perfect for Sat1.

Keshet Tresor Fiction
At the end of 2018, Tresor TV and KI launched the scripted division Keshet Tresor Fiction to extend Tresor's success into the fiction sector. Recent orders include a German adaptation of the Israeli black comedy Stockholm for RTL's VOX and TVNow entitled Unter Freunden Stirbt Man Nicht (You Don’t Die Among Friends).

Greenbird Media
In March 2018, Keshet International acquired a majority stake in Greenbird Media, the British production company incubator, investor and business accelerator founded by joint Managing Directors Jamie Munro and Stuart Mullin.

See also
Keshet Media Group

References

External links
Official site
Show catalogue

Mass media companies established in 2012
Companies based in Tel Aviv